The 2019–20 Michigan Wolverines women's basketball team represented the University of Michigan during the 2019–20 NCAA Division I women's basketball season. The Wolverines, led by head coach Kim Barnes Arico in her eighth year, played their home games at the Crisler Center. This season marked the program's 38th season as a member of the Big Ten Conference.

Previous season
The Wolverines finished the 2018–19 season with a 22–12 record, including 11–7 in Big Ten play to finish in fourth place. They advanced to the semifinals of the Big Ten women's tournament for the first time since 2001, where they lost to Maryland. They received an at-large bid to the 2019 NCAA Division I women's basketball tournament, where they defeated Kansas State in the first round before losing to Louisville in the second round.

Off-season
On May 20, 2019, Toyelle Wilson was named an assistant coach and recruiting coordinator for Michigan's women's basketball team.

Roster

Schedule

|-
! colspan="9" style="background:#242961; color:#F7BE05;"| Exhibition

|-
! colspan="9" style="background:#242961; color:#F7BE05;"| Non-conference regular season

|-
! colspan="9" style="background:#242961; color:#F7BE05;"| Big Ten conference season

|-
! colspan="9" style="background:#242961; color:#F7BE05;"| Big Ten Women's Tournament

Rankings

^Coaches did not release a Week 2 poll.

References

Michigan
Michigan Wolverines women's basketball seasons
Michigan
Michigan